Cheshire County Council was the county council of Cheshire. Founded on 1 April 1889, it was officially dissolved on 31 March 2009, when it and its districts were superseded by two unitary authorities; Cheshire West and Chester and Cheshire East.

At the time of its abolition in 2009, it had six districts: Chester, Congleton, Crewe and Nantwich, Ellesmere Port and Neston, Macclesfield, and Vale Royal.

History
Cheshire County Council was created on 1 April 1889 under the Local Government Act 1888, which established elected county councils across England and Wales to take over the local government functions previously performed by the Quarter Sessions. Certain large towns were made county boroughs, administering their own affairs independently from the county councils. When Cheshire County Council was established in 1889, three county boroughs were created in Cheshire: Birkenhead, Chester, and Stockport. The area of the county excluding these towns was known as the administrative county and was the area under the jurisdiction of Cheshire County Council. Wallasey was later made a county borough in 1913, removing it from the administrative county.

Under the Local Government Act 1972, Cheshire was reconstituted as a non-metropolitan county and had its boundaries revised, with an area in the north-east of the county (including Stockport) being transferred to Greater Manchester, the Wirral peninsula (including Birkenhead and Wallasey) being transferred to Merseyside and the eastern tip of the county at Tintwistle being transferred to Derbyshire. In return, the county gained the area around Widnes and Warrington from Lancashire. County boroughs were abolished at the same time, and so the city of Chester came under the jurisdiction of the county council for the first time. The lower tier of local government was also reorganised, with the county's previous municipal boroughs, urban districts and rural districts being replaced by eight non-metropolitan districts. These changes all took effect on 1 April 1974.

On 1 April 1998, two of the county's districts, Halton and Warrington, became unitary authorities, making them independent from Cheshire County Council.

Cheshire County Council and its six remaining districts were abolished on 31 March 2009. From 1 April 2009 the area formed two unitary authorities, with Cheshire East covering the area of the former Congleton, Crewe and Nantwich and Macclesfield districts, and Cheshire West and Chester covering the area of the former Chester, Ellesmere Port and Neston, and Vale Royal districts.

Premises
From 1889 until 1957 the county council met at the Crewe Arms Hotel in Crewe as a location conveniently accessible by railway to most of the county. Work began on building a new County Hall on Castle Drive in Chester in 1938, but work on the building was paused due to the Second World War, and it was not formally opened until 1957. After Cheshire County Council's abolition, County Hall was sold to the University of Chester.

Political control
From 1889 until 1970, elections to the county council were generally held every three years. As part of the reforms under the Local Government Act 1972, those councillors still in post in 1972 on the old county council had their terms of office extended to 31 March 1974. The first election to the reconstituted county council was held in 1973, initially operating as a shadow authority until the new arrangements came into effect on 1 April 1974. Elections were thereafter generally held every four years for the county council. The last election to Cheshire County Council was held in 2005. Voting for the new unitary authorities took place on 1 May 2008, which then acted as shadow authorities until formally taking over from the abolished county and district councils on 1 April 2009. Political control of Cheshire County Council from 1974 until its abolition in 2009 was held by the following parties:

Leadership
The chairmen of the county council from 1889 until the 1974 reforms were:
 1889–1893: Duncan Graham.
 1893–1922: Col. Sir George Dixon, 1st Baronet, JP, DL.
 1922–1935: Sir William Hodgson, JP.
 1935–1940: Maj. Thomas Clayton Toler.
 1940–1944: Joseph Cooke.
 1944–1948: Maj. Hewitt Pearson Montague Beames, CBE.
 1948–1951: Sir Edward Otho Glover.
 1952–1967: Lt-Col. Sir John Wesley Emberton.
 1968–1974: Sir Herbert John Salisbury Dewes, CBE, JP, DL.

The leaders of the council from 1974 until 2009 were:

Council elections
1973 Cheshire County Council election
1977 Cheshire County Council election
1981 Cheshire County Council election
1985 Cheshire County Council election
1989 Cheshire County Council election
1993 Cheshire County Council election
1997 Cheshire County Council election
2001 Cheshire County Council election
2005 Cheshire County Council election

By-election results

External links
Cheshire Council

References

Former county councils of England
1889 establishments in England
2009 disestablishments in England
Former local authorities in Cheshire
Local government in Cheshire
Council elections in Cheshire
County council elections in England